North Cotes or North Coates is a village and civil parish in the East Lindsey district of Lincolnshire, England.

The Grade II* listed church is dedicated to Saint Nicholas and is built of limestone, dating from the 13th century, although mostly rebuilt in 1865 by James Fowler of Louth. The upper part of the font is 12th-century and the lower part 19th-century. There is a medieval scheduled standing cross with square base in St Nicholas churchyard, believed to be in its original position.

Ivy Cottage, in the village, is a Grade II* listed building dating from the early 18th century which is unaltered and in its original condition.

RAF North Coates 

RAF North Coates was opened during the First World War, and closed in June 1919. It reopened in 1927 as an Armament Practice Camp, and during the Second World War was operated by Coastal Command. Post-war it was home to several Maintenance Units, but in 1963 it to become Britain's first Bloodhound surface-to-air missile site. It was closed in 1990. From 1992 various sections of the airfield and buildings were sold off. It is now home to the North Coates Flying Club.

References

External links

"Duke Of Edinburgh Visits R.A.F. Airfield (1958), British Pathé. Retrieved 10 November 2014
"North Coates", Genuki, Retrieved 10 November 2014

Villages in Lincolnshire
Civil parishes in Lincolnshire
East Lindsey District